"Wishful Thinking" is a song by English new wave and synth-pop band China Crisis, released as the third single from their second studio album Working with Fire and Steel – Possible Pop Songs Volume Two (1983). It reached #9 in the UK charts in early 1984, becoming their only top 10 hit single in their homeland. The song is their biggest and most well-known hit, and is included on numerous compilation albums. It was a top 20 hit in several European countries and hit number 1 on the Swedish radio chart Poporama on 8 March 1984.

The lead vocals on this track are sang by Eddie Lundon who also wrote the lyrics, as opposed to Gary Daly who sings lead vocals on the majority of the band's songs.

The track "This Occupation" remains exclusive to this release and appears in two very different forms on the 7" and 12" releases.

The track "Some People I Know to Lead Fantastic Lives" is taken from the band's debut studio album Difficult Shapes & Passive Rhythms, Some People Think It's Fun to Entertain (1982), although the remix on this 12" single remains exclusive to this release.

Track listing

7" vinyl single

12" vinyl single

Chart performance

References

External links
 

1984 singles
China Crisis songs
1983 songs
Song recordings produced by Mike Howlett
Virgin Records singles
Music videos directed by Tim Pope